Fazel Mand (also Romanized as Fāẕel Mand, Fāzel Mand, and Fazlmand; also known as Fāzeh Mand and Fazīmand) is a village in Shabeh Rural District, Jangal District, Roshtkhar County, Razavi Khorasan Province, Iran. At the 2006 census, its population was 587, in 134 families.

References 

Populated places in Roshtkhar County